Luke James Clough (4 July 1878 – 3 December 1956) was an Australian politician.

He was born at Pinegrove near Echuca to farmer Thomas Clough and Mary Howe. He became a market gardener in Bendigo and then a bootmaker. He was a founding member of the Bendigo East branch of the Labor Party and served as branch president; he was also on the state executive from 1911 to 1914. In 1915 he won a by-election for the Victorian Legislative Assembly seat of Bendigo East, and served as a backbench Labor member until 1927, when his seat was abolished and he was defeated for preselection in the new seat of Bendigo. Clough died in Bendigo in 1956.

References

1878 births
1956 deaths
Australian Labor Party members of the Parliament of Victoria
Members of the Victorian Legislative Assembly